Yang Mo (August 25, 1914 – December 11, 1995) was a Chinese writer best known for her 1958 novel Song of Youth, which was adapted into a film in 1959.

Bibliography
 Song of Youth  (1958)
 Tenant (1963)
 My Physician (1964)
 The Red Morningstar Lily (1964)
 The Best Song in Her Prime (1986)

See also 
 List of Chinese films of the 1950s#1959

References

1914 births
1995 deaths
Writers from Beijing
Chinese women novelists
20th-century Chinese women writers
20th-century Chinese novelists